"If You Needed Somebody" is a song by Bad Company. It was released in 1990 as a single from their album Holy Water.

The song is the band's first top 40 hit since 1979's "Rock 'n' Roll Fantasy", peaking at No. 16 on the Billboard Hot 100.

Chart performance

References

Bad Company songs
1990 singles
1990 songs
Songs written by Brian Howe (singer)
Atco Records singles